Bergeborbeck is a northern borough of the city of Essen, Germany, with a population of around 4,400. It was incorporated into the city in 1915, having previously been part of the Bürgermeisterei Borbeck (Borbeck district).

S-Bahn trains have a stop at Bergeborbeck station, which is named after the borough, but located within the boundaries of nearby Bochold.

The football stadium of Georg-Melches-Stadion was located in Bergeborbeck before it was demolished and replaced by nearby Stadion Essen in 2012.

Geography 
Bergeborbeck borders the boroughs of Vogelheim to the east, Bochold to the south, and Borbeck-Mitte, Gerschede and Dellwig in the west.

Sources 

Essen